Foat is a surname. Notable people with the surname include:

Ginny Foat (born 1941), American politician
Jim Foat (born 1952), English cricketer

English-language surnames